Loveladies is a neighborhood and unincorporated community located in the northernmost portion of Long Beach Township, in Ocean County, New Jersey, United States. The area is on Long Beach Island, between Barnegat Light and Harvey Cedars.

History
In 1871, a location of the United States Life-Saving Service was established in the area. There was a small,  island in the bay adjacent to the station which was owned by a man named Thomas Lovelady. The area was called Lovelady's, which eventually evolved to Loveladies. It has frequently been noted on lists of unusual place names.

Beaches
All of Loveladies' beaches are open to the public. There are four access points off of Long Beach Boulevard for visitor access, all of which have free public parking available:

 Dolphin Lane (North Pumping Station)
 Coast Avenue
 Loveladies Lane (South Pumping Station)
 Seashell Lane

Long Beach Island Foundation of the Arts and Sciences
Loveladies is home to the Long Beach Island Foundation of the Arts and Sciences, established in 1948 by artist Boris Blai. The organization provides arts, science and recreation programs to area residents and visitors.  The Long Beach Island Foundation of the Arts and Sciences offers an After School Arts Education Program to area schools, an Artists Residency and Retreat Program for New Jersey Artists, Visiting Artists in Ceramics during the summer season, and ceramics scholarships and residency opportunities.

Climate

According to the Köppen climate classification system, Loveladies, New Jersey has a humid subtropical climate (Cfa) with hot, moderately humid summers, cool winters and year-around precipitation. Cfa climates are characterized by all months having an average mean temperature > 32.0 °F (> 0.0 °C), at least four months with an average mean temperature ≥ 50.0 °F (≥ 10.0 °C), at least one month with an average mean temperature ≥ 71.6 °F (≥ 22.0 °C) and no significant precipitation difference between seasons. During the summer months in Loveladies, a cooling afternoon sea breeze is present on most days, but episodes of extreme heat and humidity can occur with heat index values ≥ 95 °F (≥ 35 °C). During the winter months, episodes of extreme cold and wind can occur with wind chill values < 0 °F (< -18 °C). The plant hardiness zone at Loveladies Beach is 7a with an average annual extreme minimum air temperature of 3.3 °F (-15.9 °C). The average seasonal (Nov-Apr) snowfall total is between 12 and 18 inches (31 and 46 cm), and the average snowiest month is February which corresponds with the annual peak in nor'easter activity.

Ecology

According to the A. W. Kuchler U.S. potential natural vegetation types, Loveladies, New Jersey would have a dominant vegetation type of Northern Cordgrass (73) with a dominant vegetation form of Coastal Prairie (20).

References

External links
Loveladies Property Owners Association
Loveladies Harbor Organization
Loveladies: General Information

Jersey Shore communities in Ocean County
Long Beach Island
Long Beach Township, New Jersey
Unincorporated communities in Ocean County, New Jersey
Unincorporated communities in New Jersey